Apotoforma monochroma is a species of moth of the family Tortricidae. It is found in Haiti.

The wingspan is about 12 mm. The forewings are reddish brown, with slightly paler mottling on the 
outer half and a slight shining greyish shade preceded by a slender ferruginous line before the termen. The hindwings are dark fuscous.

References

Moths described in 1897
Tortricini
Moths of the Caribbean